Pomaderris velutina, commonly known as velvety pomaderris or velvet pomaderris, is a species of flowering plant in the family Rhamnaceae and is endemic to south-eastern continental Australia. It is a slender shrub with rusty-hairy young stems, egg-shaped to oblong or more or less elliptic leaves, and loose panicles of pale yellow flowers.

Description
The upper surface of the leaves is densely covered with velvety hairs, the lower surface covered with scattered long hairs. Flowering occurs in October and November.

Taxonomy
Pomaderris velutina was first formally described in 1942 by James Hamlyn Willis in The Victorian Naturalist based on plant material collected from the headwaters of the Ovens River between Bright and Porepunkah in 1941. The specific epithet (velutina) means "velvety".

Distribution and habitat
Velvety pomaderris grows in forest and woodland mainly in steep, rocky sites, but also along creeks and gorges in eastern Victoria and south of Lake Burragorang in New South Wales.

References

velutina
Flora of New South Wales
Flora of Victoria (Australia)
Plants described in 1942
Taxa named by James Hamlyn Willis